Lipowy Most  is a village in the administrative district of Gmina Szudziałowo, within Sokółka County, Podlaskie Voivodeship, in north-eastern Poland, close to the border with Belarus.

There is only one in whole region golf court with Driving Range and hotel and Spa.

References

Lipowy Most